Lim Ding Wen (林鼎文, born 21 September 1999) is a young programmer living in Singapore. In 2009, at the age of 9, he is the youngest iPhone developer in Singapore, responsible for the app Doodle Kids.

He started programming at the age of 7 with the help of his father. He wrote many applications including Doodle Kids and Invader War on the Apple IIGS. He later rewrote Doodle Kids for the iPhone and then Android platforms. Between the time it was launched till the end of 2010, Doodle Kids has been downloaded more than 880,000 times (iOS and Android platforms combined).

References 

 Ars Technica: Nine-year-old makes waves with iPhone programming skillz
 AsiaOne: Only 9, but he's written iPhone app
 BBC: Nine-year-old writes iPhone code
 CBC: Boy, 9, writes program that lets kids 'fingerpaint' on iPhone
 CNN International: Child prodigies: Very young, extraordinarily gifted
 Engadget: Nine-year old writes iPhone app, hates vegetables
 Engineering to inspire: Young Developers: Lim Ding Wen (Doodle kids)
 GigaOm: 9 Year-Old App Developer More Than Just a Feel-Good Story
 Gizmodo: 9 Year Old Writes iPhone Application
 Macworld: Nine-year-old boy writes popular iPhone app
 New Straits Times: Tech: All in the family
 RetroMacCast: The world youngest iPhone developer?
 Reuters: Nine-year old whiz-kid writes iPhone application
 Sky News: Could This Be The New Bill Gates?
 Straits Times: Boy, 9, writes program which scores 480,000 hits
 Video Games Singapore: Movers and Shakers – Lim Ding Wen
 Wired: Father/Son Team Develops iPhone Apps
 YouTube: Singaporean Lim Ding Wen showcases his programming chops

Singaporean computer programmers
Living people
Year of birth missing (living people)